Le Châtelard (altitude ) is a locality in the canton of Valais, Switzerland near the border with France. It is part of the municipality of Finhaut.

Transportation 
The  metre gauge Chemin de Fer de Martigny au Châtelard and Ligne de Saint Gervais - Vallorcine make an end to end connection here. There is a road from Martigny via the Forclaz pass. This Road continues across the French border to Vallorcine and then beyond to Chamonix.

From Le Châtelard, Funiculaire du Châtelard leads to the Lac d'Émosson.

References 

Villages in Valais